Tomás Frías (1804–1884) was twice president of Bolivia.

Tomás Frías may also refer to:

 Tomás Frías Province, in Bolivia
 Tomás Frías Autonomous University, a Bolivian university